Jonas Narmontas (born 14 September 1960) is a Lithuanian former rower who competed for the Soviet Union in the 1980 Summer Olympics and in the 1988 Summer Olympics.

In 1980 he was a crew member of the Soviet boat which won the bronze medal in the eights event.

Eight years later he participated with the Soviet boat in the 1988 coxed fours competition but they did not start in the final B.

External links
 

1960 births
Living people
Lithuanian male rowers
Soviet male rowers
Olympic rowers of the Soviet Union
Rowers at the 1980 Summer Olympics
Rowers at the 1988 Summer Olympics
Olympic bronze medalists for the Soviet Union
Olympic medalists in rowing
Medalists at the 1980 Summer Olympics
World Rowing Championships medalists for the Soviet Union